James K. "Pat" Dwyer (August 30, 1884 – March 29, 1939) was an American football player and coach. He served as the head coach at Louisiana State University (1911–1913) and the University of Toledo (1923–1925), compiling a career record of 28–22–2.

Playing career
Dwyer was a graduate of the University of Pennsylvania. He lettered in football two seasons, 1906 and 1907, for Penn under coach Carl Sheldon Williams. In 1906, Dwyer helped the Quakers to a 7–2–3 record. In 1907, Penn went 11–1, and was retroactively awarded a national championship by Parke H. Davis with other organizations naming Yale as champion. These Penn teams were led by All-Americans August Ziegler at guard and Dexter Draper at tackle.

Coaching career
Dwyer coached football from 1918 to 1920 at Scott High School in Toledo Ohio.

Death
Dwyer died in 1939 of a heart attack.

Head coaching record

College

References

External links
 

1884 births
1939 deaths
American football centers
Auburn Tigers football coaches
Detroit Titans football coaches
LSU Tigers football coaches
Penn Quakers football players
Toledo Rockets football coaches
High school football coaches in Ohio
People from Tioga County, Pennsylvania
Coaches of American football from Pennsylvania
Players of American football from Philadelphia